Since 1970, the Social Democrats had held the mayor's position in the municipality. They had at least since 1981 had an absolute majority of seats added to that.

In the last election, they won 12 of the 19 seats, and Thomas Gyldal Petersen would therefore go into his third full term as mayor.

In this election, however, they would lose their absolute majority. Only one party from the blue bloc would win representation though, and 14 of the 19 seats would be for parties of the traditional red bloc. There would be majority with all the elected red bloc parties, that would support Thomas Gyldal Petersen as mayor.

This election would be one of only four, where Venstre failed to win representation.

Electoral system
For elections to Danish municipalities, a number varying from 9 to 31 are chosen to be elected to the municipal council. The seats are then allocated using the D'Hondt method and a closed list proportional representation.
Herlev Municipality had 19 seats in 2021

Unlike in Danish General Elections, in elections to municipal councils, electoral alliances are allowed.

Electoral alliances  

Electoral Alliance 1

Electoral Alliance 2

Results

Notes

References 

Herlev